Hyde (also known as The Hyde) is a civil parish in the county of Bedfordshire.  It lies just south-east of Luton.

Most of the land to the west of the River Lea is occupied by the Luton Hoo estate, which includes West Hyde.  To the east of the river, the parish contains the ruins of Someries Castle and the hamlets of Chiltern Green, East Hyde and New Mill End.

Hyde was served by two railway stations, Luton Hoo and Chiltern Green, but these have since closed.

References

External links

An incomplete account of East Hyde, West Hyde and Hyde Parish on seekinghyde.org.uk Retrieved 9 November 2009

Civil parishes in Bedfordshire
Central Bedfordshire District